Richard Leslie Christie (born October 21, 1948, in Long Beach, California) is an American actor. He is best known for portraying Ted Lawson on the 1980s sitcom Small Wonder.

His other television credits include Who's the Boss?, Days of Our Lives, Hunter, Mama's Family, Knots Landing, Newhart, Hart to Hart, The Waltons, The Ropers and Breaking Bad. He also wrote the 1999 film Molly.

As of October 2013, he began playing the recurring role of Charlie Webber on the CBS daytime drama The Bold and the Beautiful.

Filmography
The Last Word (1979) – Medic
Any Which Way You Can (1980) – Jackson Officer
Honky Tonk Freeway (1981) – Auto Mechanic
Looker (1981) – Father
Small Wonder (1985–1989) – Ted Lawson
Molly (1999) – Maitre D'
The Spy Next Door (2010) – Father in Church
Undocumented (2010) – Deputy
50 to 1 (2014) – Ben Huffman
Hell or High Water (2016) – Loan Officer
Breaking Bad (Season 2 Episode 13, 2009) – Stew

References

External links

Biography at smallwonder.tv

1948 births
Living people
20th-century American male actors
21st-century American male actors
American male film actors
American male soap opera actors
American male television actors